Furrs (also called Hoyle) is an unincorporated community in Pontotoc County, Mississippi, United States.

History
A school was noted in Furrs in 1885. Furrs had a post office, and a population of 66 in 1900.

References

Unincorporated communities in Pontotoc County, Mississippi
Unincorporated communities in Mississippi